Sumana Das Goradia is an Indian television actress. She appeared in the role of Shamoli on Bayttaab Dil Kee Tamanna Hai and has also appeared as Riya in Kya Mast Hai Life on the Disney Channel. Sumana Das was born in Diphu, Assam. Her elder sister Madhumita Das too is a television actor.

Television

References

Living people
Indian television actresses
Actresses in Hindi television
Year of birth missing (living people)